Rusty Rivets is a Canadian 3D CGI animated television series produced by Arc Productions and Spin Master Entertainment for Treehouse TV and Nickelodeon. Inspired by elements of the maker culture, it follows the adventures of a young inventor named Rusty and his team of customized robots.

Twenty-six episodes for the first season were confirmed. On May 24, 2017, it was renewed for a second season. On May 22, 2018, it was renewed for a third season.

Series overview

Season 1 (2016–17)

Season 2 (2018–19) 
The second season premiered on January 9, 2018 in the United States.

Season 3 (2019-20)

References 

Lists of Canadian children's animated television series episodes
Lists of Nickelodeon television series episodes